Saad Haroon is a Pakistani comedian, actor, and writer. He is the creator of the first ever Pakistani improvisational comedy troupe "BlackFish", and was the first Pakistani stand-up comedian to perform in English in cities across Pakistan in his tour "Saad Haroon: Very Live".
Haroon created and hosted the first ever English language comedy television show in Pakistan, called The Real News.  In October 2014, he was voted the second funniest person in the world, securing 59,213 votes in the Laugh Factory competition.

Improvisational comedy 
Haroon worked on "SHARK" in 2008, the first improv troupe to tour Pakistan and perform Long Form Improvisational Comedy. SHARK's tour included performances in Karachi, Islamabad and Lahore where audiences throughout Pakistan witnessed musical forms of improv comedy and a long form improv structure known as the Harold for the first time. SHARK's lineup includes Haroon, Danish Ali, Umair Pervez, Jaffar Ali, Daniyal Ahmed, Sohaib Khan, and Sana Nasir.

In 2002, Haroon created BlackFish, Pakistan's first improv troupe, which was chosen to represent Pakistan in an international Theater Project at Contact Theatre in Manchester, England. Haroon stepped down as director of BlackFish in 2005 to pursue other projects but has continued to work on other projects with Contact Theatre.

Haroon is also creator, co-writer and director of ‘We’ve made contact’; a half improvised half scripted original format play created for the British councils Connecting Futures Project which was performed in Manchester, England.

Open mic nights 
Saad Haroon arranges Open Mic Nights which features aspiring comedians, writers, poets, and other talented enthusiasts.

The Real News 
The Real News is Pakistan's first ever English Language comedy show in Pakistan. Created and hosted by Haroon, the show pokes fun at current news events using political and social satire.

Conan (talk show) 
Saad Haroon’s video sketch was selected by Conan O’Brien as part of the opening monologue for his show. “The sketch is about how people in Pakistan enjoy Conan’s late night talk show,” Nabhan Karim, the director of the video, told The Express Tribune.

References

External links
 (archived June 2017)

Pakistani stand-up comedians
Pakistani television hosts
Living people
Pakistani satirists
Pakistani male television actors
People from Karachi
Comedians from Karachi
Male actors from Karachi
Year of birth missing (living people)